Penny Priddy (born March 5, 1944 in Toronto, Ontario) is a politician from British Columbia, Canada. Priddy is the only woman in Canadian history to be elected to school board, city council, a provincial legislature and the House of Commons.

Originally a nurse, she moved from Ontario to Surrey, British Columbia in 1981 where she worked as a nursing educator. After five years as a school trustee on Surrey's school board, she ran in the 1991 provincial election as a British Columbia New Democratic Party (NDP) candidate in Surrey-Newton, defeating Premier Rita Johnston to win the riding by over 10 points. She subsequently served in several cabinet posts including Women's Equality, Tourism and Culture, Health, Labour and Children and Families in the NDP governments of Mike Harcourt, Glen Clark, Dan Miller and Ujjal Dosanjh.

In 1996, she was treated for breast cancer and made a full recovery.

She did not run in the 2001 British Columbia election, but returned to politics in 2002 when she was elected to Surrey City Council.

From 2006 to 2008, she was the federal NDP Member of Parliament for the riding of Surrey North, which was represented by independent Chuck Cadman until his death from cancer.  Priddy had been friends with Cadman and his wife, Dona, for many years despite their sharp political differences. Dona Cadman later endorsed Priddy for the Surrey North seat, considered by some to be the deciding factor in her victory over Conservative candidate David Matta.

Priddy did not run in the 40th Canadian federal election.

In 2001, Priddy was awarded an honorary Doctorate of Law degree from Kwantlen University College for her service to the people of BC.

She is past co-chair of the Women's Campaign School and she is a member of the Canadian Women Voters Congress and Canadian Women of Municipal Government.

Priddy is currently a member of the board of directors for Vancouver Fraser Port Authority and a member of the Heritage Advisory Commission for the City of Surrey.

References

External links
Legislative Assembly Profile

1944 births
21st-century Canadian politicians
21st-century Canadian women politicians
British Columbia New Democratic Party MLAs
Education ministers of British Columbia
Health ministers of British Columbia
Living people
Members of the Executive Council of British Columbia
Members of the House of Commons of Canada from British Columbia
New Democratic Party MPs
Politicians from Toronto
Surrey, British Columbia city councillors
Tourism ministers of British Columbia
Women MLAs in British Columbia
Women municipal councillors in Canada
Women government ministers of Canada
Women members of the House of Commons of Canada